Achol Jok Mach (born 1983) is a South Sudanese activist and tech entrepreneur, who uses radio production and podcasting as innovative approaches to peace-building.

Early life and education 
Mach was born in South Sudan in 1984. Her family left South Sudan near the beginning of the civil war and she grew up in Cuba. In 1997 her family moved to Canada. She has spoken out about her experience growing up there and how it affected her identity, she said: "I was only ever told, "You are South Sudanese"... It was only much later that I learned I was Dinka." She has a degree from the University of Alberta in Literature.

In 2011 she voluntarily returned to South Sudan with the aspiration to contribute positively to the new nation. On her return to Juba, the first thing she did was to touch the soil.

Career
Mach is a technology entrepreneur and spoke about the achievements of Peace Tech Lab at the 2018 Peace Tech Summit. 
Her work uses radio production and podcasting as a means to work with communities and counter prejudice.

In 2019, Mach was a speaker and representative at the National Dialogue Conference in Helsinki, which enabled a variety of stakeholders in the field of peace studies and conflict resolution to come together.  Her 2019 Global Research Initiative Fellowship funds a research project to analyse the effect of hate speech by South Sudanese politicians on diaspora communities, and questions whether that effect in turn encourages further conflict, both virtually and offline.

Awards 
In 2019 Mach was awarded a Global Research Initiative Fellowship.

References

External links 

 Let's Talk podcast featuring Achol Jok Mach in conversation with South Sudanese community leaders and citizens.
 Peacetech

Living people
1983 births
South Sudanese activists
Women podcasters
South Sudanese women
Women activists
Dinka people
University of Alberta alumni
Radio producers
African pacifists
Women radio producers